The Asian Lawn Bowls Championship is a lawn bowls competition held between national bowls organisations in Asia.

Past winners

Men

Women

See also
 World Bowls Events

References

Bowls competitions
2001 establishments in Hong Kong
Lawn bowls in the Philippines